One Red Sun, a Counting Book is a 1998 children's picture book that emulates and includes the work of American author and illustrator Ezra Jack Keats.

1998 children's books
American picture books
Books by Ezra Jack Keats